The list of Mexican Navy ships comprises all of the vessels that make up the Mexican Navy. The Mexican Navy operates four frigates, two missile boats and a number of patrol ships for both offshore and inshore patrol. The Mexican Navy also has six tank landing ships at its disposal.

Ships by number

Frigates
 Reformador class - 1

Offshore patrol vessels

 Valle class - 9
  - 5
  - 4
  - 3
  - 4
  - 8

Coastal patrol boats

  - 9
 Demócrata class - 2
  - 3
 Punta class - 2
  - 10

Interceptor patrol boats 
Polaris class - 48
 - 6
 - 2
Polaris II class - 17

Tank landing ships
 Papaloapan class - 2

Logistics ships 
 Montes Azules class - 2 
 Isla Madre class - 1

Training ships 

 Cuauhtémoc class - 1

Transport ships 

 Nautla class - 1

Tankers 

 Aguascalientes class - 2

Tugboats 

 Otomí class - 3
 Volcán class - 6
Multipurpose
 Huasteco class - 2

List of ships

Decommissioned ships

Historical ship

References 

 
Mexico